Temecula Valley Unified School District is a school district located in the southwestern portion of Riverside County, California, serving the city of Temecula and unincorporated parts of nearby Murrieta and French Valley. It is the fourth-largest school district in Riverside County. The district's Board of Education elections take place in November of even-numbered years and elected members to serve four-year terms. The Board of Education is composed of five members, elected by geographical districts called Trustee Areas.

Elementary schools
Alamos Elementary
Ysabel Barnett Elementary
Crowne Hill Elementary School
French Valley Elementary
Helen Hunt Jackson Elementary
Susan LaVorgna Elementary
Nicolas Valley Elementary
Paloma Elementary
Pauba Valley Elementary
Rancho Elementary
Red Hawk Elementary
Abby Reinke Elementary
Temecula Elementary
Temecula Luiseño Elementary
Tony Tobin Elementary
Vail Elementary
Vintage Hills Elementary

Middle schools
Bella Vista Middle
James L. Day Middle
Erle Stanley Gardner Middle
Margarita Middle
Temecula Middle
Vail Ranch Middle

High schools
Chaparral High School
Great Oak High School
Rancho Vista High School
Susan Nelson High School
Temecula Valley High School

Charter schools
Temecula Preparatory School
Temecula Valley Charter School

Future schools
Roripaugh Ranch Elementary
Old Town Elementary
Middle School #7 (Roripaugh Ranch)
High School #4 (French Valley)
K-8 STEAM Academy

See also
 List of school districts in California by county

References

External links
 

School districts in Riverside County, California
Temecula, California
1989 establishments in California
School districts established in 1989